Oksana Lada (born March 3, 1976) is a Ukrainian actress, best known for the role as Irina Peltsin, the mistress of Tony Soprano, on the HBO TV series The Sopranos.

Early life and education 
Lada was born in Ivano-Frankivsk, the Western region of Ukraine. At the age of 20, she studied economics and engineering in the Ivano-Frankivsk National Technical University of Oil and Gas and worked as a model before emigrating to the United States.

Career 
Lada appeared as Ulia in the Netflix Original Series Orange Is the New Black. Lada gained recognition as the lead in an Off-Broadway revival of Pentecost, which was nominated for a Drama Desk Award in 2005. She also had a role as a wedding dress saleswoman in 30 Rock in the first episode of the show's second season, "SeinfeldVision".

After the Inauguration of Donald Trump, Lada was a guest at the newly elected president's Inauguration Ball, one of two representatives from Hollywood along with Caitlyn Jenner.

Filmography

Film

Television

Web

References

External links

1979 births
Living people
Actors from Ivano-Frankivsk
Ukrainian television actresses